Reina Wakisaka (born 2 May 1999) is a Japanese professional footballer who plays as a midfielder for WE League club Nojima Stella Kanagawa Sagamihara.

Club career 
Wakisaka made her WE League debut on 12 September 2021.

References 

Living people
1995 births
Japanese women's footballers
Women's association football midfielders
Association football people from Osaka Prefecture
Nojima Stella Kanagawa Sagamihara players
WE League players